Jiwdhara railway station is a railway station on Muzaffarpur–Gorakhpur main line under the Samastipur railway division of East Central Railway zone. This is situated beside National Highway 28A at Jiwdhara in East Champaran district of the Indian state of Bihar.

References

Railway stations in East Champaran district
Samastipur railway division